Andy Böhme (born 26 April 1970 in Salzwedel, Bezirk Magdeburg) is a German skeleton racer who competed from 1993 to 2002. He won two medals in the men's skeleton event at the FIBT World Championships, with a gold in 2000, and a silver in 1999.

Böhme won the men's Skeleton World Cup overall title twice (199899, 19992000).

References
List of men's skeleton World Cup champions since 1987.
Men's skeleton world championship medalists since 1989
Official website 
Skeletonsport.com profile

1970 births
Living people
People from Salzwedel
People from Bezirk Magdeburg
German male skeleton racers
Sportspeople from Saxony-Anhalt
21st-century German people